Manon Perreault (born December 29, 1965) is a former Canadian politician, who served in the House of Commons of Canada from 2011 until 2015.  Following her election, she was named to the NDP's shadow cabinet as critic for people with disabilities. She represented the electoral district of Montcalm as a member of the New Democratic Party until June 6, 2014, when she was suspended from the NDP caucus after being charged with public mischief. She had told police some items had been stolen from her office, when in fact a former employee had the items and voluntarily offered to return them.  She was convicted on March 20, 2015.  She sat as an Independent until August 12, 2015, when she joined Strength in Democracy as their candidate in Montcalm, but she was soundly defeated in the 2015 federal election by Bloc Québécois candidate Luc Thériault.

Perreault was a municipal councillor in Sainte-Marie-Salomé, Quebec from 2002 to 2009. Before being elected to parliament, Perreault was an administrator and trainer. As a person living with restricted mobility, she worked with Kéroul, an organization promoting tourism for people with disabilities, and Handami, a regional association for people with disabilities. Perreault became a paraplegic, following an equestrian accident in 1993.

She joined former cabinet minister Steven Fletcher as a member of Parliament who uses a wheelchair, and sought, among others, to use her parliamentary position to defend people with disabilities.

References

External links
Official Website

1965 births
Horse-related accidents and incidents
Living people
New Democratic Party MPs
Members of the House of Commons of Canada from Quebec
Women members of the House of Commons of Canada
Quebec municipal councillors
People from Rimouski
Politicians with paraplegia
Canadian politicians with disabilities
Independent MPs in the Canadian House of Commons
Women municipal councillors in Canada
Strength in Democracy politicians
21st-century Canadian politicians
21st-century Canadian women politicians
Politicians affected by a party expulsion process